Clinton Charles Augustus Ritchie (August 9, 1938 – January 31, 2009) was an American actor.

Early life
Ritchie was born on a farm near Grafton, North Dakota, to J. C. and Charlotte Ritchie, and his family moved to Washington state when he was seven. Voted "Handsome Harry" by his classmates at Sunnyside High School, he moved to California at the age of 16 where he had a variety of jobs: truck driver, service station attendant, furniture factory worker, bartender (before his age of 19 was found out) and health club manager, before becoming an actor.

Career

Ritchie is best known for his acting role as Clint Buchanan, husband of heroine Victoria Lord (played by Erika Slezak) on the ABC soap opera, One Life to Live. He originated the character in 1979 and portrayed the role through 1998, with recurring stints in 1999, 2003, and 2004.

He was under contract at 20th Century Fox with Tom Selleck and is credited with teaching Selleck how to ride a horse. 

He co-starred and guest starred in numerous television Westerns during the 1950s and 1960s, including the 1965 pilot for the long-running Wild, Wild West. He also appeared in the TV series Batman as well as in many films, including First to Fight (1967), The St. Valentine's Day Massacre (1967), Bandolero! (1968), Patton (1970), Joe Kidd (1972), Against a Crooked Sky (1975), Midway (1976), Poco... Little Dog Lost (1977) and A Force of One (1979). In Patton, he portrayed a wounded tank commander who briefs Patton on a fierce night battle. His television movie roles included The Bastard, Centennial and Desperate Women.  Later, he appeared on Roseanne as Clint Buchanan, with his One Life to Live costars Robert S. Woods and John Loprieno.

Ritchie was critically injured at his California ranch on May 10, 1993, when his John Deere tractor upended, knocked him to the ground, and rolled over him. Quoted as saying that he could hear his own ribs cracking, he survived and returned to the One Life to Live set after recuperating. In the interim, his costar Slezak fought not to have his role recast with another actor. Clint was written off temporarily as having been in an airplane crash while Ritchie recuperated.

Later life

Ritchie retired in December 1998, and said that he believed the character of Clint had been damaged during the 1992 Viki-Clint-Sloan Carpenter love triangle story. He lived at his  California ranch, with his numerous dogs and cats, and 43 horses. He purchased the ranch, named the Happy Horse Ranch, in 1980 largely due to its location near Grass Valley, which is located near the site of the annual Tevis Cup 100-mile endurance horse race. His character on One Life to Live had a ranch in Arizona with the same name, and several of Ritchie's horses had been used on the show.

Death
In late January 2009, Ritchie had surgery to implant a pacemaker. Although the surgery was a success, a blood clot traveled to his brain, resulting in a massive stroke. He died a few days later about 4:00 a.m. on January 31, 2009, aged 70. His friend and costar Phil Carey, who played his father Asa Buchanan on One Life to Live, died of lung cancer six days after Ritchie's death. Ritchie was cremated.

Filmography

References

External links

Clint Ritchie - Soap Central.com
UPI report of Ritchie's death

1938 births
2009 deaths
American male soap opera actors
American male television actors
Male actors from North Dakota
People from Placer County, California
People from Walsh County, North Dakota
20th-century American male actors